Dorylomorpha occidens is a species of fly in the family Pipunculidae.

Distribution
United States (Alaska, Idaho), Great Britain, Russia, Estonia, Finland, Latvia, Norway, Sweden, Netherlands.

References

Pipunculidae
Insects described in 1939
Diptera of Europe
Diptera of North America
Taxa named by D. Elmo Hardy